"Walking in the Air" is a song written by Howard Blake for the 1982 animated film The Snowman based on Raymond Briggs's 1978 children's book of the same name. The song forms the centrepiece of The Snowman, which has become a seasonal favourite on British and Finnish television. The story relates the fleeting adventures of a young boy and a snowman who has come to life. In the second part of the story, the boy and the snowman fly to the North Pole. "Walking in the Air" is the theme for the journey. They attend a party of snowmen, at which the boy seems to be the only human until they meet Father Christmas with his reindeer, and the boy is given a scarf with a snowman pattern. In the film, the song was performed by St Paul's Cathedral choirboy Peter Auty; this performance was reissued in 1985 (on Stiff Records) and 1987.

In 1985, an altered version was recorded for use in a TV advertising campaign for Toys "R" Us. While it was believed that Auty's voice had then broken, Auty claimed in an interview with BBC Breakfast News on 2 December 2022 that his voice had not broken and he was never contacted for the recording.  Blake recommended the then-14-year-old Welsh chorister Aled Jones, whose recording reached number five in the UK Singles Chart, and who became a popular celebrity on the strength of his performance. The association of the song with Jones, combined with Auty not being credited on The Snowman, led to a common misbelief that Jones performed the song in the film.  "Walking in the Air" has subsequently been performed by over forty artists, in a variety of styles. In a UK poll in 2012, the Aled Jones version was voted 13th on the ITV television special The Nation's Favourite Christmas Song.

Nightwish version

In 1998, Finnish symphonic metal band Nightwish covered the song for their second studio album, Oceanborn, in a power ballad style. A shorter version of it was released on 30 January 1999 as the second single from the album, featuring two b-sides. It spent eighteen weeks on the Finnish charts, peaking at number one for a week. The band named the compilation Walking in the Air: The Greatest Ballads after this song.

The song was performed regularly during Tarja Turunen's time with the band as the lead singer; after her departure, she went on to record her own version for her 2006 winter album Henkäys Ikuisuudesta.

Nightwish's founding member and keyboardist Tuomas Holopainen had stated that it is his all-time favourite piece of music.

Track listing
 "Walking in the Air" (radio edit) – 3:41
 "Nightquest" (Tuomas Holopainen) – 4:15
 "Tutankhamen" (Nightwish, Holopainen) – 5:30

Other notable recorded versions 
 Aled Jones (as a teen boy soprano) reached number 5 in the UK Singles Chart in 1985 with his cover. He released it again, in a duet with himself (as an adult baritone), on his 2007 Album You Raise Me Up: The Best of Aled Jones. In 2022, Jones recorded a duet version with tenor Russell Watson, which was included on the Christmas with Aled and Russell album of the same year.
 Chloë Agnew (from Celtic Woman) in 2004 released her debut solo album titled Walking in the Air which hit number 13 on Billboard's Classical Albums Chart, and peaked at number 4 on Billboard's World Music chart. The song is the first track.
 Digital Dream Baby's "Walking in the Air", an electronic dance remix, peaked at number 49 in December 1991 in the UK's album chart.
 McFly released their cover of the song on 2 December 2021. The single enjoyed a brief run on the UK Downloads chart, topping at number 25.

Uses in other media
 A parody version of it was used in a Scottish television commercial in 2006, for an Irn-Bru advert. It was reused in the advert's sequel in 2018.
 It was used in a 2013 World Wide Fund for Nature commercial showing on YouTube, performed by Vajèn van den Bosch.

References

External links
 Recordings of The Snowman & Walking In The Air

British Christmas songs
1999 singles
Nightwish songs
Number-one singles in Finland
1982 songs
CBS Records singles
Spinefarm Records singles